César-François Cassini de Thury (17 June 1714 – 4 September 1784), also called Cassini III or Cassini de Thury, was a French astronomer and cartographer.

Biography 

Cassini de Thury was born in Thury-sous-Clermont, in the Oise department, the second son of Jacques Cassini and Suzanne Françoise Charpentier de Charmois. He was a grandson of Giovanni Domenico Cassini, and would become the father of Jean-Dominique Cassini, Comte de Cassini.

In 1739, he became a member of the French Academy of Sciences as a supernumerary adjunct astronomer, in 1741 as an adjunct astronomer, and in 1745 as a full member astronomer.

In January, 1751 he was elected a Fellow of the Royal Society.

He succeeded to his father's official position in 1756 and continued the hereditary surveying operations. In 1744, he began the construction of a great topographical map of France, one of the landmarks in the history of cartography. Completed by his son Jean-Dominique,  and published by the Académie des Sciences from 1744 to 1793, its 180 plates are known as the Cassini map (fr).

The post of director of the Paris observatory was created for his benefit in 1771 when the establishment ceased to be a dependency of the French Academy of Sciences.

His chief works are: La méridienne de l’Observatoire Royal de Paris (1744), an arc measurement correction of the Paris meridian (Dunkirk-Collioure arc measurement (Cassini de Thury and de Lacaille)); Description géométrique de la terre (1775); and Description géométrique de la France (1784), which was completed by his son ("").

César-François Cassini de Thury died of smallpox in Paris on 4 September 1784.

Works 
La méridienne de l’Observatoire Royal de Paris (1744)
Description géométrique de la terre (1775)
Description géométrique de la France (1784)

Bibliography 

D. Aubin, Femmes, vulgarisation et pratique des sciences au siècle des Lumières : Les Dialogues sur l’astronomie et la Lettre sur la figure de la Terre de César-François Cassini de Thury, Brepols (2020)

See also 

Cassini projection

References

External links 
 List of online works available on Gallica
 Cassini map online on EHESS site
 cartocassini site, gathers old maps and allows for various manipulations, notably finding all Cassini maps in Gallica
 Cassini map in Géoportail (IGN)
 Cassini map superimposed over Google Maps' map of France - David Rumsey
 Paris Observatory digital library

1714 births
1784 deaths
Giovanni Domenico Cassini
Scientists from Paris
18th-century French astronomers
18th-century French cartographers
Members of the French Academy of Sciences
Fellows of the Royal Society
Deaths from smallpox
Infectious disease deaths in France
French geodesists